Wind in the Wire is the eighth studio album released by American country music artist Randy Travis. Released in 1993 on Warner Bros. Records, the album was made to accompany a television series also entitled Wind in the Wire. Two of the album's singles — "Cowboy Boogie" and the title track — entered the Billboard country music charts, peaking at #46 and #65, respectively, making this the first album of Travis's career not to produce any Top 40 hits in the United States. "Cowboy Boogie", however, was a #10 on the RPM Country Tracks charts in Canada.

In addition, this album is also one of three albums not to be produced by Travis' longtime record producer, Kyle Lehning.

Track listing
"Down at the Old Corral" (Roger Brown, Luke Reed) – 3:17
"Cowboy Boogie" (Robert Blythe) – 2:48
"Blue Mesa" (Brown, Reed) – 2:59
"Memories of Santa Fe" (Brown, Rick Peoples) – 3:18
"Roamin' Wyomin'" (Brown, Reed) – 2:30
"Wind in the Wire" (David Wilkie, Stewart MacDougall) – 3:29
"The Old Chisholm Trail" (Traditional) – 3:06
"Paniolo Country" (Marcus Shutte, Jr.) – 2:37
"Hula Hands" (William D. Beasley, J.T. Adams, Jean Norris) – 2:12
"Beyond the Reef" (Jack Pitman) – 2:30

Personnel

 Eddie Bayers - drums
 Bruce Bouton - dobro, pedal steel guitar
 Mark Casstevens - acoustic guitar
 Glen Duncan - fiddle
 Sonny Garrish - pedabro, pedal steel guitar
 Steve Gibson - dobro, acoustic guitar, electric guitar, mandolin
 Rob Hajacos - fiddle
 David Hungate - bass guitar
 John Barlow Jarvis - keyboards
 Kapena - background vocals
 Charlie McCoy - harmonica
 Craig Nelson - bass guitar
 Cyril Pahinui - slack key guitar
 James Bla Pahinui - ukulele
 Martin Pahinui - bass guitar
 Gary Prim - keyboards
 Randy Scruggs - acoustic guitar
 Karen Taylor-Good - background vocals
 Randy Travis - acoustic guitar, lead vocals
 Dick Tunney - accordion
 Billy Joe Walker Jr. - acoustic guitar, electric guitar
 Bergen White - background vocals
 Willie K. - background vocals
 Dennis Wilson - background vocals
 Lonnie Wilson - drums
 Curtis Young - background vocals

Chart performance

References

1993 albums
Randy Travis albums
Warner Records albums